7 First Kisses is a South Korean promotional web series produced for Lotte Duty Free Shop. It aired online through Naver TV Cast and YouTube every Monday and Thursday at 10:00 (KST) from December 5, 2016, to January 5, 2017.

Synopsis
Min Soo-jin (Lee Cho-hee) is a Lotte Duty Free store employee who has never been in a relationship before. One day, she meets the goddess of date (Choi Ji-woo) who grants her an attempt to pick the perfect partner for her first kiss among seven men. Her options were a religious tech billionaire (Lee Joon-gi), a serious yet romantic boss (Park Hae-jin), a sexy secret agent (Ji Chang-wook), an adorable younger male friend (Kai), an innocent chaebol heir (Ok Taec-yeon), a beloved K-pop idol (Lee Jong-suk) and, finally, a free-spirited travel writer (Lee Min-ho).

Cast

Main

 Lee Cho-hee as Min Soo-jin 
 Choi Ji-woo as Goddess (Ep. 1, 7)
 Lee Joon-gi as himself (Ep. 1–2)
 Park Hae-jin as himself (Ep. 2–3)
 Ji Chang-wook  as himself (Ep. 3–4)
 Kim Jong-in as himself (Ep. 4–5)
 Ok Taec-yeon as himself (Ep. 5–6)
 Lee Jong-suk as himself (Ep. 6–7)
 Lee Min-ho as himself (Ep. 8)

Others

 Lee Chung-mi as Ji-young	
 Kim Hyun-jung as Sun-yeong (colleague #1)
 Lee Chung-mi as Ji-yeong (colleague #2)
 Seo Yeong-sam as a store manager
 Lee Hyo-joo as a girlfriend (Ep. 1)
 Noh Woo-jin as a pervert (Ep. 3)
 Lee Cha-yeon as a police officer #1
 Kim Yong-tae as a police officer #2

Special appearance
 Kim Ji-hoon as a man in the mall (Ep. 1)

Original soundtrack

Track listing

Production
The press conference was held at Lotte Cinema in Jamshil, Seoul on November 22, 2016.

List of episodes

References

South Korean web series
2016 web series debuts
2017 web series endings
Naver TV original programming